Morgantown High School is a public high school in Morgantown, West Virginia, United States. It is one of three secondary schools in the Monongalia County School District. Athletic teams compete as the Morgantown Mohigans in the West Virginia Secondary School Activities Commission as a member of the Ohio Valley Athletic Conference.

In addition to sections of Morgantown, it serves Star City.

Former President George W. Bush visited Morgantown High School.

Background
The institution has existed since 1883 while operating on its current campus since 1927. Students largely come from one of the three feeder schools, South Middle School, Suncrest Middle School, or St. Francis de Sales Central Catholic.  As of the 2019–2020 school year, it has an enrollment of 1,851 students.  Among the school's student activities are over 20 varsity sports. Morgantown High offers 23 Advanced Placement classes.

Fine arts 
The band has a marching band, which is the Morgantown High School Red & Blue Marching Band. The band has performed in the Macy's Thanksgiving Day Parade in November 2009, the 2013 Tournament of Roses parade in Pasadena, California, and the 2014 National Cherry Blossom Festival Parade in Washington, D.C. In December 2016, the band represented West Virginia in the 75th Anniversary Commemoration Parade of Pearl Harbor in Honolulu, Hawaii.

Athletics
Morgantown High School is the home of the Mohigans, the name of a non-existent Native American tribe whose name is a combination of the words Morgantown (MO) High (HIG) Annual (AN), the school's original yearbook. The Native American mascot and logo were adopted because of the close relation to the name Mohican, an actual Native American tribe.

In July 2020, a petition was launched to change the school mascot, logo, and the majorette uniforms that include a variation of a traditional Native American headdress on the grounds that it is an outdated caricature of Native American people. Counter petitions, demanding the caricature remain, as well as petitions to change the MHS mascot to the Mothman have also been launched.

State championships
Morgantown High School athletic programs are well represented at the state level.  MHS has produced over sixty West Virginia State Championships in multiple sports.

Notable alumni
Ralph Albertazzie, former Air Force One pilot
Earl E. Anderson, Assistant Commandant of the Marine Corps (1971-1972)
Joseph E. Antonini, former CEO of Kmart
Carey Bailey, football coach
Thomas W. Bennett, conscientious objector and Medal of Honor Recipient
Terry Bowden, football coach
Tommy Bowden, football coach
Wesley G. Bush, former CEO of Northrop Grumman
Emily Calandrelli, science TV host on Xploration Station and Bill Nye Saves the World
Thomas Canning, American composer
Chaim Gingold, game designer
Charles Harold Haden II, Chief Justice of the Supreme Court of Appeals of West Virginia
Jay Jacobs, color analyst on MSNsportsNET.com
Lawrence Kasdan, film producer, director, screenwriter
Don Knotts, actor
Chelsea Malone, singer and Miss West Virginia 2015
Asra Nomani, Author
David Newbold, comic book artist
Elliott Portnoy, attorney and chief executive of the law firm SNR Denton
David Selby, actor
Michael Tomasky, journalist, author, editor in chief of Democracy quarterly journal
Charles M. Vest, former president of MIT

Reputation 
Morgantown High School has been highly ranked in school rankings. According to Niche, it is ranked #1 public high school in West Virginia. In fact, one student, Carter Herron, got a perfect score on his ACT, and got no questions wrong on his AP Government & Politics exam.

In popular culture 
Morgantown High School appears in the video game Fallout 76, set in West Virginia.

References

External links
 

Educational institutions established in 1883
Buildings and structures in Morgantown, West Virginia
Public high schools in West Virginia
Schools in Monongalia County, West Virginia
1883 establishments in West Virginia